In Greek mythology, Thesprotus (Ancient Greek: Θεσπρωτός) may refer to two individuals:

Thesprotus, an Arcadian prince as one of the 50 sons of the impious King Lycaon either by the naiad Cyllene, Nonacris or by an unknown woman. He was the eponymous hero of Thesprotia. His son was Ambrax eponymous of Ambracia. Thresprotus and his siblings were the most nefarious and carefree of all people. To test them, Zeus visited them in the form of a peasant. They mixed the entrails of a child into the god's meal, whereupon the enraged king of the gods threw the meal over the table. Thesprotus was killed, along with his brothers and their father, by a lightning bolt of the god.
Thesprotus, king of the country where Lake Avernus is said to be, related to the myth of Atreus and Thyestes. The latter fled to Thesprotus after his brother killed his infant sons. Later on, Atreus met Pelopia, daughter of Thyestes, and thinking that the girl was Thesprotus's daughter, he asked the king to have her be given to him in marriage.

Notes

References 

Apollodorus, The Library with an English Translation by Sir James George Frazer, F.B.A., F.R.S. in 2 Volumes, Cambridge, MA, Harvard University Press; London, William Heinemann Ltd. 1921. . Online version at the Perseus Digital Library. Greek text available from the same website.
Dionysus of Halicarnassus, Roman Antiquities. English translation by Earnest Cary in the Loeb Classical Library, 7 volumes. Harvard University Press, 1937-1950. Online version at Bill Thayer's Web Site
Dionysius of Halicarnassus, Antiquitatum Romanarum quae supersunt, Vol I-IV. . Karl Jacoby. In Aedibus B.G. Teubneri. Leipzig. 1885. Greek text available at the Perseus Digital Library.
Gaius Julius Hyginus, Fabulae from The Myths of Hyginus translated and edited by Mary Grant. University of Kansas Publications in Humanistic Studies. Online version at the Topos Text Project.
Pausanias, Description of Greece with an English Translation by W.H.S. Jones, Litt.D., and H.A. Ormerod, M.A., in 4 Volumes. Cambridge, MA, Harvard University Press; London, William Heinemann Ltd. 1918. . Online version at the Perseus Digital Library
Pausanias, Graeciae Descriptio. 3 vols. Leipzig, Teubner. 1903.  Greek text available at the Perseus Digital Library.
Who's Who in Classical Mythology  By Michael Grant, John Hazel

Princes in Greek mythology
Sons of Lycaon
Mythological kings of Arcadia
Kings in Greek mythology
Arcadian characters in Greek mythology
Arcadian mythology
Epirotic mythology